Shane Patrick Crotty (born 26 January 1974) is a professor of immunology in the Center for Infectious Disease and Vaccine Research at La Jolla Institute for Immunology.

Education and academic posts
Crotty completed B.S. degrees in Biology and Writing from Massachusetts Institute of Technology in 1996. He then completed his Ph.D. in 2001 at the University of California, San Francisco with Raul Andino.

Crotty went on to a postdoctoral fellowship from 2001 to 2003 with Rafi Ahmed at Emory University Vaccine Center studying immunity to viruses. He joined the La Jolla Institute for Immunology (LJI) in 2003, as well as the department of medicine of University of California, San Diego, in 2004 as an adjunct assistant professor. He became an associate member with tenure at LJI in 2009, and then a tenured professor.

Research
Crotty's research has focused on immune responses to viral infections, in particular those driven by vaccines. His lab has done major work on the regulation and proliferation of follicular helper T cells, as well as immunological protection from HIV infection and HIV vaccine delivery strategy. In close collaboration with Alessandro Sette, Crotty published the first detailed analysis of the human immune response to SARS-CoV-2, the virus that causes COVID-19, and later confirmed that the adaptive immune response is lasting.

In 2020, Crotty joined the LJI Coronavirus Taskforce to study immune system responses with an aim of informing vaccines and therapies against the novel coronavirus, SARS-CoV-2. His lab studies the adaptive immune response against SARS-CoV-2. In May 2020, his lab co-published the first detailed analysis of how the immune system responds to SARS-CoV-2, with LJI Professor Alessandro Sette. This research suggested that the human body may be capable of long-term immunity to SARS-CoV-2 following infection or vaccine administration. Crotty has since published research showing that "uncoordinated" immune cell responses are related to COVID-19 case severity. His lab has also collaborated with Sette to show that T cells that react to common cold coronaviruses can also recognize SARS-CoV-2. Crotty has warned that this T-cell immunity does not equal protection against the virus.

Major publications

Other publications
Crotty is also the author of a biography of David Baltimore entitled Ahead of the Curve. He is the co-editor with Rafi Ahmed of Immune Memory and Vaccines: Great Debates.

References

External links

 

1974 births
Living people
Massachusetts Institute of Technology alumni
University of California, San Francisco alumni
American immunologists
American virologists